Yoann Le Boulanger (born 4 November 1975 in Guingamp, Côtes-d'Armor) is a French former professional road bicycle racer. His sporting career began with Roue d`Or Begarroise.

Major results

 Tour du Doubs (2006)
 2007 Tour de Pologne - Mountains Classification
 Tour de la Somme - 1 stage (2003)
 Tour de l'Avenir - 1 stage (1999)

External links 
Profile at Bouygues Télécom official website

References 

1975 births
Living people
People from Guingamp
French male cyclists
Sportspeople from Côtes-d'Armor
Cyclists from Brittany